John Davenport (8 June 1789 – 1877) was a British orientalist and writer. He is best known for his book An Apology for Mohammed and the Koran.

Life
He was born on 8 June 1789, in London. His father was from Staffordshire. Like his father, Davenport was a liveryman. He lost his sight in his later life.
Joscelyn Godwin describes him as "a poor scrivener who led a precarious existence teaching Oriental languages and writing hack literature". Davenport is known for writing some books which deal with erotic subjects.

His book An Apology for Mohammed and the Koran has been translated into several different languages.

Works
 Sexagyma: A Digest of the Works of John Davenport
 Aphrodisiacs and Anti-aphrodisiacs: Three Essays on the Powers of Reproduction
 Curiositates Eroticæ Physiologiæ: Or, Tabooed Subjects Freely Treated
 An apology for Mohammed and the Koran
 Muhammad and teachings of Quran
 A new dictionary of the Italian and English languages
 Life of Ali Pacha of Janina
 Oude Vindicated
 Koorg and its Rajahs
 Aide Mémoire to the History of India
 Historical Class Book

References

1877 deaths
1789 births
English orientalists
English erotica writers